The Enns is a southern tributary of the river Danube, joining northward at Enns, Austria. It forms much of the border between the states of Lower Austria and Upper Austria. The Enns spans , in a flat-J-shape. It flows from its source near the village Flachau, generally eastward through Radstadt, Schladming, and Liezen, then turns north near Hieflau, to flow past Weyer and Ternberg through Steyr, and further north to the Danube at Enns (see map in References).

Name
It was known in Latin as Anisus or Anasus, of uncertain origin; Anreiter et al. tried to link it to an Indo-European *on- and the hydronymic suffix *-is-. Later sources call it Ensa or Enisa. Others have linked it to Upper Danubian Vasconic *an, "water." Another possible link is Greek ᾰ̓νῠστός (anystos, "useful"). The West Slavic languages have different names for the river: in Czech it is called the Enže; in Slovak, the Enža; and in Polish, the Aniza.

Geography 
The Enns has its source in the Radstädter Tauern mountains in the Austrian state of Salzburg. In a valley which developed during the ice age, it flows at the border between the Northern Limestone Alps and the Central Eastern Alps on an eastern trajectory through Styria, where it passes the Dachstein group at its southern side. North of Steyr, it forms the border between Upper Austria and Lower Austria (formerly also known as Austria above the Enns and Austria below the Enns). Finally, it meets the Danube at Mauthausen and the city of Enns. It is the longest river solely in Austria.

The Anisian Age in the Triassic Period of geological time is named from Anisus, the Latin name of the river Enns.

History 

In total, ten power plants with a total generative power of 345 megawatts have been built by the Ennskraftwerke AG.

Towns along the river

in Salzburg 
Radstadt

in Styria 
Schladming
Gröbming
Liezen
Selzthal
Admont

in Upper Austria 
Großraming
Ternberg
Garsten
Steyr
Enns

Hydroelectric power stations 
Currently, there are 15 hydroelectric power stations on the Enns. The power stations are listed beginning at the headwaters:

Tributaries 
The most important inflows are the Palten, the Salza and the Steyr. Other tributaries are the Northern Taurach and the Erzbach.

Transport 
A major transit route connecting Germany and Slovenia through Austria runs through the Enns valley.
The so-called  ("iron road") runs along the river between Hieflau and Enns, along which iron ore has been transported from the Styrian Erzberg ("ore mountain") to the steel mill in Linz.

References

Rivers of Salzburg (state)
Rivers of Styria
Rivers of Upper Austria
Ennstal Alps
 
Rivers of Austria